Dead Eyes See No Future is the second EP by Swedish melodic death metal band Arch Enemy. It was released on 2 November 2004 through Century Media Records.

The title track is taken from Arch Enemy's Anthems of Rebellion album.

"Burning Angel", "We Will Rise" and "Heart of Darkness" are live tracks from a concert at Elysée Montmartre in Paris on 27 February 2004.  The studio versions of "Burning Angel" and "Heart of Darkness" can be found on Arch Enemy's Wages of Sin album.  The studio version of "We Will Rise" is on the band's Anthems of Rebellion album.

"Symphony of Destruction" is a Megadeth cover, "Kill With Power" is a Manowar cover, and "Incarnated Solvent Abuse" is a Carcass cover.

The EP also features a video for "We Will Rise".

Track listing

Personnel 
Angela Gossow – Vocals
Christopher Amott – Guitar
Michael Amott – Guitar, Artwork
Sharlee D'Angelo – Bass
Daniel Erlandsson – Drums
Per Wiberg – Keyboards
Simon Ainge – Compilation, Enhanced CD Audio Creation
Arch Enemy – Photography
Rickard Bengtsson – Producer, Engineer
George Bravo – Director
Paul Harries – Photography
Nick Mallinson – Assistant
Masa Noda – Photography
Andy Sneap – Producer, Engineer, Mixing

References

External links
 Dead Eyes See No Future at Encyclopaedia Metallum

2004 EPs
Arch Enemy albums
Albums produced by Andy Sneap
Century Media Records EPs